The Lake Oswego Odd Fellows Hall, in Lake Oswego, Oregon, was built in 1890.  It was listed on the National Register of Historic Places in 1979.  It served historically as a meeting hall of the local Independent Order of Odd Fellows chapter, which formed in 1888.  It also has served as a specialty store and in other uses.

The  by  building is one of the oldest in Lake Oswego.

References

Buildings and structures in Lake Oswego, Oregon
Odd Fellows buildings in Oregon
National Register of Historic Places in Clackamas County, Oregon
Buildings and structures in Clackamas County, Oregon
1890 establishments in Oregon